Gayle Williamson (born c. 1980, Dollingstown, Northern Ireland) is a model and the 2002 Miss Northern Ireland and the 2002 Miss United Kingdom title holders. She was also a contestant in the 2002 Miss World beauty contest.

Personal life
Williamson, lives in Crawfordsburn, County Down, with her son Brandon from a relationship with Irish musician Jim Corr.

References

1980 births
Living people
Miss Northern Ireland winners
Miss United Kingdom winners
Female models from Northern Ireland
Miss World 2002 delegates